Longford RFC is an Irish rugby team based in Longford, County Longford, playing in Division 1B of the Leinster League. The club colours are black and white.

History
Longford can certainly stake a claim as one of the oldest clubs in Ireland. It is widely accepted that there was some rugby in the area during the 1890s, owing to the presence of two army garrisons. However, it was only in 1921 that the formal establishment of a club was recorded.

The club ceased its playing activities in the post-war years, but remained affiliated to the IRFU in order to secure tickets to international matches. They started playing again in 1967.

Notable former players
 William Frazer 'Horsey' Browne Mel Deane.

References
 Longford RFC

Irish rugby union teams
Rugby clubs established in 1921
Rugby union clubs in County Longford
Sport in Longford (town)